Cerro Xinolatépetl Totonac, also Ozomatlán or Western Totonac, is a Totonac language of central Mexico.

References

Totonacan languages